This is a list of women photographers who were born in Canada or whose works are closely associated with that country.

A
 Arwa Abouon (born 1982), Libyan-Canadian photographer focused on Islamic culture
 Shelagh Alexander (1959–2017), photographic artist
 Vikky Alexander (born 1959), installation artist and photographer, often producing large murals
 Lillian B. Allen (1904–1994), painter, teacher and nature photographer
 Jennifer Alleyn (born 1969), filmmaker, writer and photographer
 Evelyn Andrus (1909–1972), photographer
 Sara Angelucci (born 1962), photography, video art
 Raymonde April (born 1953), photographer and academic, awarded the Order of Canada for her contribution to photography
 Joi Arcand (born 1982),  nehiyaw photo-based artist
 Barbara Astman (born 1950), hybrid photography and new media
 Melissa Auf der Maur (born 1972), photographer and musician

B
 Marian Penner Bancroft (born 1947), artist, photographer and educator
 Jessie Tarbox Beals (1870–1942), see United States
 Claire Beaugrand Champagne (born 1948), documentary photographer
 Sylvie Bélanger (1951–2020), video, photography, installation
 Dorothy Benson (1901–1996), wildlife photographer
 Edith Hallett Bethune (1890–1970), pictorialist photographer
 Lori Blondeau (born 1964), Cree/Saulteaux/Métis artist whose work includes performance art, installation and photography
 Theodosia Bond (1915–2009), landscape and plant photography
 Roberta Bondar (born 1945), landscape photographer, Canada's first female astronaut and the first neurologist in space
 Diane Borsato, visual artist, explore pedagogy practices through performance, intervention, video, installation, and photography
 Dianne Bos (born 1956), photographer
 Tess Boudreau (died 2007), documentary photography and artists' portrait photographs
 Deanna Bowen (born 1969), interdisciplinary artist
 Fiona Bowie, installation artist, uses film, video, photography and sculpture
 Amber Bracken (born 1984), photojournalist reporting on indigenous peoples
 Reva Brooks (1913–2004), photographed in Mexico, works in MoMA's The Family of Man exhibition
 Karin Bubaš (born 1976), contemporary artist, uses photography, drawing and painting
 Kay Burns, multidisciplinary artist

C
 Geneviève Cadieux (born 1955), women's facial expressions
 Chrystal Callahan (fl 2000s), visual artist, photographer and fashion model
 Tenille Campbell (fl 2010s), indigenous writer, poet and photographer
 Blossom Caron (1905–1999), still life
 Rosetta Ernestine Carr (1845–1907), portrait and landscape photography
 Cynthia Chalk (1913–2018), nature photography
 June Clark (artist) (born 1941), photography, sculpture and collage
 Dana Claxton (born 1959), Hunkpapa Lakota filmmaker, photographer and performance artist
 Lynne Cohen (1944–2014), see United States
 Petra Collins (born 1992), portrait and fashion photography
 Sorel Cohen (born 1936), portraiture, feminist
 Stéphanie Colvey (born 1949), documentary photography
 Erin Combs (born c. 1952), early woman photojournalist
 Henrietta Constantine (1857–1934), landscape photographer
 Marlene Creates (born 1952), visual artist
 Caitlin Cronenberg (born 1984), photographer and filmmaker
 Jill Culiner (born 1945), folk artist, photographer and writer

D
 Nathalie Daoust (born 1977), images taken in hotel rooms, a Tokyo love hotel, Berlin interiors
 Nancy Davenport (born 1965), visual artist and photographer
 Moyra Davey (born 1958), artist whose work includes photography, video and writing
 Sally Davies (artist) (born 1956), painter and photographer
 Clara Dennis (1881–1958), images of early 20th century Nova Scotia and Mi'kmaq people
 Susan Dobson (born 1965), photographer, focuses on themes of urban landscape and suburban culture
 Julie Doiron (born 1972)
 Marie-Alice Dumont (1892–1985), portrait and landscape photography
 Carol Dunlop (1946–1982), writer, translator, activist and photographer
 Chantal duPont (1942–2019), multidisciplinary artist

E
 Jessica Eaton (born 1977), minimalist and geometric photographs relying on in-camera effects
 Julie Enfield (fl 2000s), portrait photographer and writer
 Janieta Eyre (born 1971), British-born Canadian art photographer

F
 Rosalie Favell (born 1958), artist working with photography and digital collage

G
 Madame Gagné (active 1886–1891)
 Millie Gamble (1887–1986), early amateur photographer from Prince Edward Island, images of life in the Tyron area from 1905
 Lorraine Gilbert (born 1955), French-born Canadian landscape artist and photographer
 Henrietta Gilmour (1852–1926), pioneering woman photographer
 Angela Grauerholz (born 1952), German-born photographer, graphic designer and educator
 Jill Greenberg (born 1967), Canadian-born portrait photographer and pop artist
 Michelle Groskopf (fl 2017), street photographer
 Aline Gubbay (1920–2005), photographer, art historian and writer
 Mattie Gunterman (1872–1945), amateur photographer
 Clara Gutsche (born 1949), American-Canadian photographer, educator and art critic

H
 Samra Habib (fl 2014), Pakistani-Canadian photographer, writer and activist
 Jane Eaton Hamilton (born 1954), writer, poet, visual artist and photographer
 Naomi Harris (born 1973), portraits of people from sub-cultures
 Isabelle Hayeur (born 1969), visual artist working with photographs and experimental film
 Heidi Hollinger (born 1968),  political photographer
 Elsie Holloway (1882–1971), photographer, known for her portraits and historic photos of Newfoundland people and its surroundings
 April Hickox (born 1955), lens based artist, founding director of Gallery 44 Centre For Contemporary Photography

J 
 Valerie Jodoin Keaton (fl 2009), rock star photographer and musician
 Joanne Jackson Johnson (born 1943), photographer

K
 Ruth Kaplan (born 1955), artist and documentary photographer
 Zahra Kazemi (1948–2003)
 Minna Keene (1849–1943), German-Canadian pictorial portrait photographer
 Violet Keene (1893–1987), English-born Canadian photographer of artists and statesmen
 Holly King (born 1957), artist creating photographs of constructed landscapes
 Marianna Knottenbelt (born 1949), Dutch-Canadian photographer, architect and real-estate developer

L
 Donna Laframboise (fl 1990s), photographer and journalist
 Gisèle Lamoureux (1942–2018), photographer, botanist and ecologist
 Rita Leistner (fl 2000s), photojournalist and filmmaker
 Laura Letinsky (born 1962), contemporary photography, best known for her still lifes
 Élise L'Heureux (1827–1896), 19th century Quebec City photographer
 Elaine Ling (1946–2016), photographer
 Judith Lodge (born 1941), American Canadian painter and photographer

M
 Margaret Malandruccolo (fl 2000s), photographer and music video director
 Lesia Maruschak (born 1961), known for her Project Maria
 Mia Matthes (1920–2010), architecture and landscape photographer
 Edith Maybin (born 1969), photographer
 Hannah Maynard (1834–1918), portrait and experimental photographer
 Jo-Anne McArthur (born 1976), photojournalist and animal rights activist
 Helen McCall (1899–1956)
 Susan McEachern (born 1951), American-Canadian photographer, work often includes text
 Sheila McKinnon, Canadian born photographer and journalist
 Meryl McMaster (born 1988), photographer whose best known work explores her Indigenous heritage
 Jean Gainfort Merrill (born 1913), photojournalist
 Léna Mill-Reuillard (fl 2016), cinematographer and photographer
 Lorraine Monk (1922–2020), photographer, helped establish the Canadian Museum of Contemporary Photography, Order of Canada for contributions to photography
 Geraldine Moodie (1854–1945), pioneering photographer, images include the Innu people around Hudson Bay
 Julie Moos (born 1966), art photography
 Alexandra Morrison, photographer
 Marie-Jeanne Musiol (born 1950), Swiss-Canadian photographer
 Nadia Myre (born 1974), contemporary visual artist

N
 Shelley Niro (born 1954), Mohawk multidisciplinary artist
 Farah Nosh (active since 2002), Iraqi-Canadian photojournalist

P 
 Indrani Pal-Chaudhuri (born 1983), Indian-Canadian-British feminist director and fashion photographer
 Thelma Pepper (1920–2020)  
 Nancy Petry (born 1931), known for innovation within the fields of painting, photography, film and performance art
 Jenny Pike (1922–2004), developed D-Day photos during WWII, later worked as darkroom technician for Canadian police

R
 Nina Raginsky (born 1941), worked freelance for the National Film Board of Canada, best known for frontal, full-figure portraits=
 Sylvie Readman (born 1958), photographer exhibited in the National Gallery
 Gladys Reeves (1890–1974), professional photographer in Edmonton
 Dominique Rey (born 1976), photographer
Charlotte Rosshandler (born 1943), Canadian-American photographer
 Alix Cléo Roubaud (1952–1983), photographer

S
 June Sauer (born 1920s), Montreal fashion photographer specializing in fur
 Faye Schulman (1919–2015), Jewish partisan photographer
 Sandra Semchuk (born 1948), photographer
 Erin Shirreff (born 1975), multidisciplinary artist, primarily works with photography, sculpture and video
 Floria Sigismondi (born 1965), Italian-Canadian film director, screenwriter, music video director, artist and photographer
 Leah Singer, photographer and multimedia artist
 Clara Sipprell (1885–1975), early 20th century landscape photographer, also known for her portraits of famous actors, artists, writers and scientists
 Lana Šlezić (fl 2000s), photographer and filmmaker
 Mary Spencer (1857–1938), photographer, photojournalist and artist
 Barbara Spohr (1955–1987), photographed Alberta city scenes and people
 Elaine Stocki (born 1979), educator known for her paintings and photographs

T 
 Althea Thauberger (born 1970), visual artist

V
Adriene K. Veninger (born 1958), artist and photographer

W
 Margaret Watkins (1884–1969), remembered for her contributions to advertising photography
 Edith Watson (1861–1943), known for her photojournalistic images of everyday life, working people, and women, particularly in Canada
 Sally Elizabeth Wood (1857–1928), early woman photographer in Quebec's Eastern Townships

Y 
 Jin-me Yoon (born 1960), South Korean-born multidisciplinary artist, who often works with photography, video and elements of performance

See also 
 List of women photographers

-
Canadian women photographers, List of
Photographers
Photographers